Falcon a.s. is a Czech film company founded in 1994. It focuses on distribution of Czech and foreign films. It distributed box office hits including Anděl Páně 2 or Avengers: Endgame. Falcon is one of main film distributors in the Czech Republic along with Cinemart, Vertical Entertainment a.s. and Bontonfilm. Its main rival is Cinemart.

As of 2020 Falcon holds 12% market share being the 6th largest Czech film distributor.

Films

Czech

References

External links

Entertainment companies established in 1994
Mass media companies established in 1994
Czech film companies
Entertainment companies of the Czech Republic